Justin Lazard (born November 30, 1967) is an American retired actor, producer, director, and model.

Early life
Lazard was born in New York, but raised in Connecticut. His father, Sidney Lazard, is a former foreign correspondent, and his mother, Julie (née Thayer), is a photographer. In 1974, the family relocated to Paris where his father was stationed by ABC News. After his parents' divorce when he was a freshman in high school, Lazard marked time in boarding schools and at Emory University. Transferring to NYU to study acting, he was "discovered" in a bar by a talent agent and was soon appearing in TV commercials.

Acting career
After a small role in Spike of Bensonhurst in 1988, Lazard landed the recurring role of a punk-rock undercover cop on NBC's Miami Vice, appearing in three episodes. To pay for acting classes, he began a brief career as a model. Small parts in features (i.e., Born to Ride in 1991) and regular roles in unsuccessful series (e.g., Second Chances; CBS 1993–94) followed.

In 1995, Lazard landed the role of a charming stockbroker on the primetime CBS soap Central Park West, but the series floundered and despite some retooling and a title change to "CPW", the show was cancelled after its second season. He starred in Extreme (1995) as part of a Rocky Mountain rescue team but the series was cut short after 7 episodes. He had a role in the direct-to-video release The Big Fall (1997).

Working in partnership with his brother Marc through Lazard Productions, he began to create material for himself. His most notable role was in Species II (1998) as an astronaut who mutates into an alien bent on having sex with human women and impregnating them, creating a race of alien children. He went on to produce the thriller Dark Harbor (1998), which he co-scripted with director Adam Coleman Howard. Lazard also served as executive producer on Stanley's Gig in 2000, written and directed by his brother, Marc. This would be his last acting role before retiring from the industry.

Personal life
Lazard married model Shannon Fluet in 2008. She appeared as a model in Project Runway (season 2) and has been represented by the Ford Models and Click Models. The couple has one child.

On the evening of July 4, 2006 in Lakeport, California, Lazard was arrested and charged with indecent exposure and resisting arrest, having been "exposing himself near one of the piers" of the local park. During the arrest, he was tasered by one of the officers. In May 2009, he failed to appear in court and a bench warrant was subsequently issued for his arrest.

In January 2011, Lazard reached a plea agreement with Lake County prosecutors regarding the charges of 2006. He pleaded guilty to a misdemeanor charge of "lewd conduct", with the other charges being dismissed, and agreed to pay $7,500 to a named family resource center. His  psychiatrist attested that his behavior was due to a transitory “severe psychotic breakdown” and that "treatment had worked well" in his case.

His most recent film activity was as co-producer of The Americans Are Coming, the Americans Are Coming! in 2003.

Filmography

References

External links
 

1967 births
American male film actors
American male television actors
American film directors
American film producers
American male soap opera actors
Male models from Connecticut
Male actors from Connecticut
Emory University alumni
Tisch School of the Arts alumni
Living people